Liliamnis Rosabal Salazar (born 3 July 1999) is a Cuban handball player for Granma and the Cuban national team.

She competed at the 2015 World Women's Handball Championship in Denmark.

References

1999 births
Living people
Cuban female handball players
Handball players at the 2019 Pan American Games
Pan American Games medalists in handball
Pan American Games bronze medalists for Cuba
Medalists at the 2019 Pan American Games
21st-century Cuban women